Environment: Science and Policy for Sustainable Development, commonly referred to as Environment magazine, is published bi-monthly in Philadelphia by Taylor & Francis. Environment is a hybrid, peer-reviewed, popular environmental science publication and website, aimed at a broad, "smart, but uninitiated" population. Its Executive Editors are Susan L. Cutter (University of South Carolina), Ralph Hamann, Myanna Lahsen, Alan H. McGowan (The New School), Tim O'Riordan (University of East Anglia), and Linxiu Zhang.

History 
Environment was founded in the late 1950s as Nuclear Information, a mimeographed newsletter published by Barry Commoner at the Center for the Biology of Natural Systems, at Washington University, in St. Louis, Missouri. It was renamed Scientist and Citizen from 1964-1968. From 1973 it was published by the Scientist's Institute for Public Information (SIPI) chaired by Margaret Mead, and later by a small commercial publisher.

 Its full title, Environment: Science and Policy for Sustainable Development helps to distinguish it from other journals including Environments published by MDPI and The Environment published by the Chartered Institution of Water and Environmental Management (CIWEM).

Academic recognition
The journal has a Scopus citescore index of 0.89 in 2016, giving it a ranking of 99th out of 183 journals listed in the category 'Water Science and Technology' and 76/128 in 'Renewable Energy, Sustainability and the Environment'. These are relatively low because Scopus counts citations of articles in the journal in academic literature over the previous three years, and this journal is not a fully academic publication. Also, it is not available Open Access.

In the Web of Science, a more selective citation index also based on the previous three years citations, it has a score of 1.852 for 2016, placing it 46/105 in the category 'environmental studies'  and 112/229 in 'Environmental Science'.

Highly cited articles per year include:
Nisbet, M.C. 2009. Communicating Climate Change Why Frames Matter for Public Engagement. ENVIRONMENT 51(2): 12-23.
Gardner, G.T. and Stern, P.C.2008. The short list - The most effective actions US households can take to curb climate change. ENVIRONMENT 50(5): 12-24. 
Dunlap, R.E. and McCright, A.M. 2008. A widening gap - Republican and Democratic views on climate change. ENVIRONMENT50(5): 26-35.

References

1958 establishments in Missouri
Bimonthly magazines published in the United States
American environmental websites
Environmental magazines
Magazines established in 1958
Magazines published in Philadelphia
Magazines published in St. Louis